Michael Peter Karsten Bürsch (3 June 1942 – 9 December 2012) was a German politician and member of the SPD. He was born in Stettin (Szczecin), Province of Pomerania, which is now in Poland.

References

External links 
 Official website 

1942 births
2012 deaths
Politicians from Szczecin
People from the Province of Pomerania
Members of the Bundestag for Schleswig-Holstein
University of Kiel alumni
Members of the Bundestag 2005–2009
Members of the Bundestag 2002–2005
Members of the Bundestag 1998–2002
Members of the Bundestag 1994–1998
Members of the Bundestag for the Social Democratic Party of Germany